Cinolis or Kinolis, also known as Cimolis or Kimolis (Κίμωλις), was a Greek small port town on the coast of ancient Paphlagonia. According to Arrian it was situate 180 stadia west of Stephane, but according to Marcian of Heraclea only 150. The nearby town of Anticinolis was located 80 stadia from Cinolis.

Its site is located near Ginoğlu, Kastamonu Province, Turkey.

References

Populated places in ancient Paphlagonia
Former populated places in Turkey
History of Kastamonu Province
Ancient Greek archaeological sites in Turkey